Taiyuan Incident, was an act of anti-government movement that involves political prisoners and prison guards of Taiyuan Prison, as well as some aboriginal youths sympathetic to their cause. The incident was classified by the government as a prison riot, while many Tangwai elements considered it to be a failed uprising against the ruling Kuomintang regime.

The Incident
In February 1970, a group of political prisoners in Taiyuan Prison secretly laid out a plan to take over the prison and began a guerrilla campaign aimed at the realization of Taiwan independence. They were able to convince some fifty Taiwanese prison guards and a number of aboriginal youths to join their cause, and planned to seize the nearby army arsenal, radio station, and a fleet docked at Taitung harbor. On February 8, the prisoners stealthily acquired firearms and were prepared for the uprising when they were caught in the act by a sergeant, whom they bayoneted to prevent him from warning the others. However, the sergeant survived the attack and the entire prison was put under lock-down. The prisoners could not unlock nor breach the gates of other blocks, and the commander of the guard company, who was collaborating with the prisoners, advised them to escape into the mountains.

Soon after the prisoners escaped, the prison was taken over by the infamous Taiwan Garrison Command, with its deputy commander General Liu Yu-chang taking command personally. The ROCMC Special Service Company and the ROCMC Amphibious Reconnaissance and Patrol Unit (also known as the Frogmen Unit) units were dispatched to secure the prison, and the entire guard company was arrested and interrogated. A forward command center was also established, and thousands of police officers, soldiers, and aboriginal youths were sent to locate and apprehend the prisoners. All prisoners were arrested by February 23.

Aftermath
In all, five prisoners and more than twenty guards were sentenced to death, while one prisoner claimed he was forced to participate and was sentenced to 15 and half years. An unspecified number of collaborators also received various sentences from 15 years to life. The authority believed that more were involved, but the prisoners claimed that no one else was involved in planning the uprising.

Not long after the incident, all prisoners of Taiyuan Prison were transferred to the so-called Oasis Villa on Green Island.

External links
台灣歷史辭典：泰源事件
史明：台灣獨立建國運動第一件武裝起義-泰源事件

Taiwan independence movement
1970 in Taiwan